Yannick Baret (born 20 December 1972) is a retired French football midfielder.

References

1972 births
Living people
French footballers
SAS Épinal players
AS Monaco FC players
En Avant Guingamp players
FC Lorient players
Association football midfielders
Ligue 1 players
Ligue 2 players